Sweden held a general election on 19 September 1982, resulting in a change of government as the Social Democrats and Olof Palme returned to government after six years in opposition. 45.6% of the vote marked the party's strongest showing since winning more than half the vote in 1968. The Moderates became larger than the Centre Party and the People's Party combined. Having already been larger than both in 1979, the Moderates firmly established itself as the dominant force on the centre-right opposition as both of their former coalition partners suffered sizeable losses in seats.

Results

Results by region

Percentage share

By votes

Results by constituency

Percentage share

By votes

Results by municipality

Blekinge

Dalarna

Kopparberg County

Gotland

Gävleborg

Halland

Jämtland

Jönköping

Kalmar

Kronoberg

Norrbotten

Skåne
Skåne was divided into two separate counties at the time. Malmöhus was divided into Fyrstadskretsen (Four-city constituency) based around the Öresund urban areas and one covering the more rural parts of the county. Kristianstad County was one constituency for the whole county.

Kristianstad

Malmö area

Malmöhus

Stockholm

Stockholm (city)

Stockholm County

Södermanland

Uppsala

Värmland

Västerbotten

Västernorrland

Västmanland

Västra Götaland
Västra Götaland did have three different counties at the time. Those were Göteborg och Bohuslän, Skaraborg and Älvsborg. There were five constituencies, namely two for Göteborg och Bohuslän, one for Skaraborg and two for Älvsborg.

Bohuslän

Gothenburg

Skaraborg

Älvsborg N

Älvsborg S

Örebro

Östergötland

References

General elections in Sweden